Air People International is a cargo airline based in Bangkok, Thailand. It operates three times weekly cargo flights between Thailand and Dhaka, Bangladesh.

History 

The airline was established in 1986 as a cargo General Sales Agent. It started operations in 2003 operating under its own code using Antonov An-12 aircraft.

External links 
 API's website

Airlines of Thailand
Cargo airlines of Thailand
Airlines established in 1986
Companies based in Bangkok
Thai companies established in 1986